William L. White is a writer on addiction recovery and policy.

Biography
White was born the eldest son in an Army family, father, William "Billy" White and mother, Alice White. His father was a construction worker and his mother was a nurse. His family grew quite large with more than 20 adopted, foster, related and siblings living in a small rural home in Decatur, Illinois. He received a bachelor's degree from Eureka College, studying psychology, sociology and history.

Career

His first job was with the Illinois Department of Mental Health in 1967, where his responsibilities were to tour the wards of the mental health institution and screen the alcoholics and addicts for community placement. In the seventies, he  became an outreach worker, gathering addicts and alcoholics from jail or hospitals and connecting them with services like Salvation Army shelters, SRO’s and AA meetings. In 1970, he worked at Chestnut Health Systems, one of the first local community treatment centers in Illinois, and  became the clinical director of the facility.

In 1975, White left to pursue a master's degree in Addiction Studies at Goddard College. Upon graduating he began working with the Illinois Dangerous Drug Commission, and then became deputy director of the National Institute on Drug Abuse’s training center in Washington DC. In 1986, he returned to the Chestnut Health System and founded the Lighthouse Institute, an addiction treatment research center.  In 1998, he published his best-known book, Slaying the Dragon: The History of Addiction Treatment and Recovery in America.
He was a senior consultant at the  Chestnut Health System engaged in research and writing on addiction treatment and recovery coaching up until his retirement in 2014. He continues to write about the history of treatment and recovery on his website.

Professional appointments 
Bill White's has held many professional appointments since 2000 to the present day including: 
 Advisory Committee, NAADAC Minority Fellowship Program
 Advisory Council, Faces and Voices of Recovery
 Advisory Board, Harm Reduction, Abstinence and Moderation (HAMS)
 Board of Directors, Betty Ford Institute
 National Advisory Board, Recovery Research Institute, Harvard Medical School
 NAADAC Recovery to Practice Advisory Committee
 UK National Treatment Agency Expert Group on Recovery-oriented Drug Treatment
 Advisory Panel, State of New Jersey Governor’s Council on Alcoholism & Drug Abuse
 Scientific Advisory Panel, Phoenix House, Inc.
 International Advisory Council, SMART Recovery
 Advisory Board, LifeRing Secular Recovery
 Advisory Board, Jewish Network of Addiction Recovery Support
 Advisory Council, Association of Recovery Schools
 Board of Directors, Wellbriety for Prisons, Inc.
 Editorial Board, Counselor Magazine
 Editorial Board, Student Assistance Journal
 Editorial Board, Quest House Review
 Board Member, Wired In to Recovery, UK
 Editorial Board, Alcoholism Treatment Quarterly
 Editorial Board, Advances in Addiction and Recovery

Awards

Books
 
 
 
 
 
  Don Coyhis and William L. White, Alcohol Problems in Native America: The Untold Story of Resistance and Recovery. Colorado Springs, CO: Coyhis Publishing & Consulting, Inc., 2006

References

External links
 

1947 births
20th-century American historians
21st-century American historians
21st-century American male writers
American male non-fiction writers
American social sciences writers
Goddard College alumni
Living people
Writers from Decatur, Illinois
Writers on addiction
Historians from Illinois